Helen White may refer to;
 Helen Magill White (1853–1944), first US woman to earn a Ph.D.
 Helen C. White (1896–1967), English professor
 Helen White (politician), New Zealand politician

See also
 Helene Raskin White (born 1949), professor of sociology at the Center for Alcohol Studies at Rutgers University